The Extraordinary and Plenipotentiary Ambassador of Peru to Hungary is the official representative of the Republic of Peru to Hungary. The ambassador to Hungary is also accredited to Serbia (since 2018) and Bosnia and Herzegovina.

Both countries established relations in the 19th century. In 1851, Austria–Hungary recognized the independence of Peru, and both countries subsequently established relations. As a result of World War I, Peru severed relations with both Germany and Austria–Hungary in 1917, reestablishing them in 1920.

After the 1968 Peruvian coup d'état and the establishment of Juan Velasco Alvarado's Revolutionary Government, relations were renewed on April 1969 with the Hungarian People's Republic as the new Peruvian government pursued closer relations with the Soviet bloc.

The Peruvian embassy in Budapest closed on January 2007 and reopened in 2017. Today, ethnic Hungarians in Latin America reside in Argentina and Peru for the most part.

List of representatives

Austria–Hungary (19th century–1917)

Hungary (1968–present)

See also
List of ambassadors of Peru to Austria
List of ambassadors of Peru to the Soviet Union
List of ambassadors of Peru to Czechoslovakia
List of ambassadors of Peru to East Germany
List of ambassadors of Peru to Yugoslavia
List of ambassadors of Peru to Bulgaria
List of ambassadors of Peru to Albania
List of ambassadors of Peru to Romania
List of ambassadors of Peru to Poland

References

Peru
Hungary